Maribor Oblast was one of the oblasts of the Kingdom of Serbs, Croats and Slovenes from 1922 to 1929. Its capital was Maribor.

History

The Kingdom of Serbs, Croats and Slovenes was formed in 1918 and was initially divided into provinces (this division was inherited from previous state administrations). In 1922, new administrative units known as oblasts (Slovene: oblasti) were introduced and the whole country was divided into 33 oblasts. Before 1922, the territory of Maribor Oblast was part of the Province of Slovenia and Province of Croatia and Slavonia.

Geography

The Maribor Oblast was composed of the traditional regions of Lower Styria, Slovene Carinthia, Prekmurje which were predominantly Slovene-speaking and Međimurje which was predominantly Croat-speaking. The Oblast bordered Austria to the north, Hungary to the east, Ljubljana Oblast to the west and Zagreb Oblast to the south.

Administrative units

Oblast included following districts:
Maribor Right Embankment
Maribor Left Embankment
Celje
Čakovec
Dolnja Lendava
Dravograd
Gornji Grad
Ljutomer
Murska Sobota
Prelog
Ptuj
Slovenj Gradec
Slovenske Konjice
Šmarje pri Jelšah

See also

Kingdom of Serbs, Croats and Slovenes
Maribor

References

 

Oblasts of the Kingdom of Serbs, Croats and Slovenes